Convento de Santa Clara may refer to:

 Convento de Santa Clara (Burgos), Spain
 Convento de Santa Clara (Carmona), Spain
 Convento de Santa Clara (Córdoba), Spain